VENOM LR is an autocannon derived from ADEN 30 mm gun, although most of its components and working principle being different. The LR stands for low recoil. It is designed to be fired from RCWS that can mount 12.7 mm machinegun.

Description 
VENOM LR is designed for Remote Weapon Station (RWS) integration where reduced recoil forces permit installation to light reconnaissance vehicles and fast patrol vessels. Venom LR’s recoil mitigation system is based on the same principles as applied to the aircraft mounted ADEN cannon. The recoil force has been reduced from around 22 kN of the standard VENOM 30 to about 7 kN (9 kN maximum). The company claimed that it is up to 50% cheaper than the Orbital ATK M230LF, thus giving it highly competitive price, non-ITAR (International Traffic in Arms Regulations) alternative to M230. The cannon is able to use AP (Armour Piercing) ammunitions, AP-T (Armour Piercing - Tracer), HEDP (High Explosive Dual Purpose), HEI (High Explosive Incendiary), HEI-T (High Explosive Incendiary - Tracer), and both standard and tracer training ammunition. VENOM LR is designed for land and naval purpose, with its naval version having some minor changes. The autocannon has been tested on Midgard 300 RWS built by Valhalla Turret and EOS R400S MK.2 Single RWS.

See also 

 VENOM 30 mm gun – lighter cannon built by the same company but with higher recoil
 Giat 30 cannon – comparable French design

References

External links
VENOM LR datasheet

30 mm artillery
Autocannon
Weapons and ammunition introduced in 2019